Jitka Chalánková (born 23 March 1957 in Bruntál) is a Czech politician, doctor, former member of Chamber of Deputies for Olomouc region and former Chairwoman of TOP 09 party. Since 2018 she is a member of the Senate where as a member of the Civic Democratic Party caucus.

References

External links
Profile on the website of TOP 09

1957 births
Living people
TOP 09 MPs
Civic Democratic Party (Czech Republic) Senators
People from Bruntál
Palacký University Olomouc alumni
Members of the Chamber of Deputies of the Czech Republic (2010–2013)
Members of the Chamber of Deputies of the Czech Republic (2013–2017)
Czech pediatricians